Volkswind GmbH  is one of the largest operators of wind farms in Germany.  
The company was founded in 1993 by Martin Daubner and Matthias Stommel, former Enercon employees. The company's headquarters is in Ganderkesee, Germany, and has worldwide subsidiaries in France, England, Poland, Bulgaria and the US.

The company develops, finances, builds and operates renewable energy wind power plants.

History and milestones 
1993

 Foundation of Volkswind as IPP
 Installation of  the first windmill with capacity of 500 kW

1997

 Acquisition of Egeln castle (Saxony-Anhalt) as new headquarters

1998

 Development of world largest 4,5 MW wind mill (Enercon E 112 height:124m; rotor width: 112m)

2001

 More than 50 MW installed

2002

 Subsidiary in Paris, France
 More than 100 MW installed

2005

 Subsidiary in Goleniów, Poland
 Subsidiary in Manchester, UK
 Development of world highest wind mill from Vestas model V90 (125m)
 More than 200 MW installed

2006

 Development of largest wind farm in Cormainville, France at that time (30 Vestas V80-2MW wind turbines with combined nameplate capacity of 60 MW)

 More than 300 MW installed

2007

 New headquarter in Ganderkesee
 Subsidiary in Bulgaria with partner
 More than 400 MW installed

2008

 Subsidiary in Portland, Oregon, USA

Gallery

References

Euler Hermes Rating 
Renewable Energy Industry 
Die Business-Welt der Regenerativen Energiewirtschaft 
Erneuerbare Energien 
Volkswind web page-Banks Ratings
Volkswind web page-Agro-Öko-Consult
Volkswind web page-Local authorities

External links 

 Volkswind GmbH web page

Wind power companies of Germany
Companies based in Lower Saxony
German companies established in 1993
Energy companies established in 1993
Renewable resource companies established in 1993